Many unusual items have been listed for sale on the auction website eBay. Some sold while other auctions were stopped by eBay because the listing breached their policies.

Buildings and land
 Bridgeville, California (population 25) was the first town to be sold on eBay in 2002, and has been up for sale three times since.
 In January 2003, Thatch Cay, the last privately held and undeveloped U.S. Virgin Island, was listed for auction by Idealight International. The minimum bid was US$3 million and the sale closed January 16, 2003.
 The city of Carlotta, California was up for auction on eBay in February 2003.
 In September 2004, the Indiana Firebirds arena football team was auctioned off, first in a regular auction that failed to reach the reserve price, and again as a "Buy it Now" item for $3.9 million.
 In late-November 2005, the original Hollywood Sign was sold on eBay for US$450,400.

 In May 2006, Isaac Butterfield from Newcastle, Australia, attempted to sell New Zealand at a starting price of A$0.01. The price had risen to $3,000 before eBay closed the auction.
 In May 2006, the remains of U.S. Fort Montgomery, a stone fortification in upstate New York built in 1844, were put up for auction on eBay. The first auction ended on June 5, 2006, with a winning bid of US$5,000,310. However, the sale was not completed, and the fort and lands surrounding it remain for sale and have been relisted on the site several times since.
 In October 2008, amidst the 2008–2011 Icelandic financial crisis, one seller put up Iceland for sale. The auction started with a bid of 99 pence and reached 10 million pounds (US$17.28 million). However, singer Björk was "not included" in the sale. The notice read: "Located in the mid-Atlantic ridge in the North Atlantic Ocean, Iceland will provide the winning bidder with – a habitable environment, Icelandic Horses and admittedly a somewhat sketchy financial situation." Bidders' questions included: "Do you offer volcano/earthquake insurance?"

Vehicles
 In June 2002, Disney sold the front section of a retired Monorail Red (Mark IV Monorail) for US$20,000.
 One of the tunnel boring machines involved in the construction of the Channel Tunnel was auctioned on eBay in 2004.
 In June 2005, the wife of Tim Shaw, a British radio DJ on Kerrang! 105.2, sold Tim's Lotus Esprit sports car with a Buy It Now price of 50 pence after she heard him flirting with model Jodie Marsh on air. The car was sold within five minutes, and it was requested that the buyer pick it up the same day.
 In May 2005, a Volkswagen Golf that had previously been registered to Cardinal Joseph Ratzinger (before he was elected Benedict XVI on April 19, 2005) was sold on eBay's German site for €188,938.88 (US$277,171.12). The winning bid was made by the GoldenPalace.com online casino, known for their outrageous eBay purchases.
 In November 2017, a 1996 Honda Accord with 141,095 miles was listed on eBay for US$499 by producer Max Lanman on behalf of his girlfriend. Lanman made a video to help sell the car, which went viral, helping the bids rise up to $150,000 before eBay accidentally removed the listing. It was once again relisted and removed by accident. CarMax offered to purchase the car for $20,000, which Lanman's girlfriend accepted.

Military vehicles
 In February 2004, a scrapped F/A-18 Hornet fighter jet was listed on eBay by Mike Landa, of Landa and Associates, with a starting bid of $1 million. He was the legal owner of the plane after purchasing it from a scrap yard and also offered to have it restored to flying condition for a Buy It Now price of $9 million. Landa also told potential buyers that maintenance of the plane would cost roughly $40,000 a month for just two to three hours of flying time. The FBI told Landa that he could only sell the plane to an American citizen residing in the United States, and that the plane must not leave U.S. airspace. The auction ended without a sale.
 In January 2004, a seaworthy 16,000-ton Brazilian aircraft carrier Minas Gerais, formerly the British , was listed. The auction was removed when eBay determined that the vessel qualified as ordnance, even though all weapons systems had been removed.
 In May 2006, a Chinese businessman named Zhang Cheng bought a former Czech Air Force MiG-21 fighter jet from a seller in the United States for $24,730. The seller, "inkgirle", refused to ship it. It is unclear whether he was scammed.
 In July 2019, four sunken WW1 warships, SMS Markgraf, SMS Karlsruhe, SMS König, and SMS Kronprinz sold for together £85,000. The asking price had been £250,000 each for three of the ships and £60,000 for the fourth ship. All ships were deliberately scuttled in 1919 in Scapa Flow (Orkney) by the German Navy. The seller explained that they had been bought from a defunct salvage company and no permission could be obtained to remove the ships from the seabed.

New species
 In September 2006, a listing for a sea urchin turned out to be a new species, later given the name Coelopleurus exquisitus.
 In August 2008, Dr. Richard Harrington, Vice President of the UK Royal Entomological Society, announced that a fossilized aphid he bought for £20 (US$27.11) from a seller in Lithuania was a previously unknown species. It has been named Mindarus harringtoni after Dr. Harrington. He had wanted to name it Mindarus ebayi, but this name was disallowed as being too flippant. The 45-million-year-old aphid, preserved in a piece of Baltic amber, is now housed in the Natural History Museum in London.

Food and drink
 In 2000, toast that was half-eaten by Justin Timberlake was sold to a 19-year-old fan for $1,025. It was put up for auction by radio station Z-100's DJ after Timberlake had left behind the toast on March 9 when he finished an interview at the station's studio.
 In May of 2004, a cough drop that had been sucked on and spat out by then-Governor of California Arnold Schwarzenegger was briefly listed on eBay with a starting price of $500.
 In December 2004, water that was said to have been left in a cup Elvis Presley once drank from was sold for US$455. The few tablespoons came from a plastic cup Presley sipped at a concert in North Carolina in 1977.
 Coventry University student Bill Bennett sold a single cornflake for £1.20 (US$1.63).
 An Australian newspaper reported in December 2004 that a single piece of the Kellogg's breakfast cereal Nutri-Grain sold on eBay for A$1,035 because it happened to bear a slight resemblance to the character E.T. from the Steven Spielberg movie. Apparently the seller went on to make even more money in relation to the sale for his appearance on a nationally televised current affairs program.
 In 2004, a partially eaten, 10-year-old grilled cheese sandwich said to bear the image of the Virgin Mary sold on eBay for $28,000.
 In December 2005, a Brussels sprout cooked on Christmas Day was listed by "crazypavingpreacher" (Andrew Henderson of Darlington, England). It sold for £99.50 (US$134.85) on January 4, 2006. The sprout had been frozen and was sent by first class post in insulated packaging to the buyer, "5077phil". The listing was reported in the Daily Star, making the front page (and was followed by a series of "copycat" listings of various vegetables). The proceeds of the sale were donated to Tearfund, a major Christian relief and development agency working in the developing world.
 In January 2006, a British man, Leigh Knight, sold an unwanted Brussels sprout left over from his Christmas dinner for £1550 (US$2100.72) in aid of cancer research.
The seller of the chicken nugget also had Szechuan Sauce, and would ship the nugget with a packet of the sauce if the buyer requested so.

People
 In 2001, the artists Mendi and Keith Obadike sold Keith's "blackness" on eBay under the "Black Americana" category as part of an art project, "Blackness for Sale." The piece was seen as a comment on the commodification of racial identity and as a reference to slave auctions. The auction was eventually shut down.
 In April 2005, American entrepreneur Matt Rouse sold the right to choose a new middle name for him. After receiving an $8,000 "Buy It Now" bid, the Utah courts refused to allow the name change. He currently still has his original middle name "Jean".
In June 2005, 30-year-old Utah mother Kari Smith auctioned off her forehead to raise the money to give her son a good education. The bidding reached $999.99 before GoldenPalace.com, a company well known for outrageous eBay purchases, paid the $10,000 Buy it Now price.
 In January 2006, a group of four men from Australia auctioned themselves to spend the weekend with the promise of "beers, snacks, good conversation and a hell of a lot of laughs" for A$1,300.
 In February 2007, after Britney Spears shaved all of her hair off in a Los Angeles salon, it was listed on eBay for US$1M before the listing was taken down.
 In May 2008, Paul Osborn from the United Kingdom listed his wife Sharon for sale on eBay, alleging that she had an affair with a coworker.
 In June 2008, Ian Usher put up his "entire life" on auction. The auction included his house in Perth, belongings, introduction to his friends, and a trial at his job. When bidding closed, his "life" sold for $384,000.
 In August 2009, a mother of six from South Arkansas auctioned off the legal rights to name her unborn child.
 In February 2011, a lock of Canadian singer Justin Bieber's hair was put up for auction on eBay by talk show host Ellen DeGeneres, who Bieber had gifted it to after cutting his hair. It sold for $40,668 in March 2011, with the proceeds going to animal rescue organization The Gentle Barn. The winning bid was made by online casino GoldenPalace.com.
 On February 24, 2016, Egyptian president Abdel Fattah el-Sisi was put up for auction on eBay, after he had said that he would sell himself if that were possible in order to raise funds for Egypt. The listing was later removed by eBay.

Other
 The  sold the German language to call attention to the growing influence of English in modern Germany.
 In January 2008, four golf balls were auctioned on eBay after being surgically removed from the carpet python that had inadvertently swallowed them whilst raiding eggs in a chicken enclosure. The story attracted considerable international attention and the balls eventually sold for more than A$1,400. The python recovered and was released.
 In November 2008, a Swedish man put a digitally hand-drawn picture of a 7-legged spider onto eBay. The picture stemmed from an article on the site 27bslash6.com wherein David Thorne claims to have attempted to pay a chiropractor's bill with a picture of a 7-legged spider, which he valued at $233.95. On eBay, the bidding price started at $233.95, with bidding ended at a sale price of US$10,000. Both the e-mail exchange and the picture have become internet hits.
 In July 2009, Dornoch Capital Advisors placed England's Coca-Cola League One Side Tranmere Rovers F.C. on eBay without permission from owner and chairman Peter Johnson. This led to Johnson issuing a statement on the team's website saying that the team was not for sale and that he had contacted eBay to have the listing removed.
 In December 2009, a woman auctioned the copyright for a never before seen four-minute home movie of Marilyn Monroe smoking a joint.
 In September 2010, a 23-year-old Stockton-on-Tees man named Michael Fawcett tried to raise money for Cancer Research by selling a ghost. The auction caught the attention of a local newspaper. However, after day 6 of the auction, eBay removed the item stating it was against their policy to sell "intangible items or items whose existence cannot be verified on receipt of them, such as ghosts, souls, or spirits".
 In November 2011, a 25-year-old Londoner named Aimee Robinson placed her plus one invitation to her brother's wedding on eBay to raise funds for her climb of Mount Kilimanjaro in January 2012 in aid of the charity Diabetes UK.
 In October 2013, Reddit user sirderpenson posted about a BIC lighter that, when lit, had a flame suspended above the lighter. He then listed the lighter on eBay, drained of butane. The auction reached bids over $100,000 before getting taken down on October 30, 2013.
 In November 2013, an anonymous Russian person placed an offer to send cremated remains into Earth orbit to the International Space Station. His close relative at the Baikonur Cosmodrome will pack an urn (containing the ashes of a loved one) with personal belongings of one of the Russian cosmonauts and send it within the Progress spacecraft to the ISS. Next, through a waste gateway, the urn will be released into space to Earth's orbit.
 In March 2014, UK eBay user Whackychop auctioned a set of six twigs found in the exclusive area of De Beauvoir in the London Borough of Hackney, East London. This went on to become a national news story and the twigs sold for £62. The winning bidder refused to pay however, believing that he had taken part in a joke and that payment was therefore unnecessary.
 In August 2014, net artist Michael Green put the 'most expensive GIF of all time' up for auction for $5800. The image was inspired by and based on a piece by artist Jeff Koons titled "Balloon Dog (Orange)". Koons' piece was sold at a Christie's auction for $58 million in 2013, setting the record for "the most expensive work by a living artist sold at auction" and inspiring Green to price his image at $5800. The winner of the auction was to receive a USB drive containing the file and a certificate of authenticity shipped to them from the artist. However, the initial auction ended in September with zero bids. The auction was subsequently re-listed and sold for $202.50.
 In 2018, the prop baby from A Serbian Film appeared on eBay before being removed.
 In December 2022, Milwaukee-based production company Red Letter Media put a third-party graded VHS tape of the South African film Nukie up for auction after destroying over 100 other Nukie tapes to inflate its value. The tape ultimately sold for $80,600, making it the most expensive VHS tape in history. The proceeds were donated to charity.
 In February 2023, a user named "gadgetgs" placed a jar of sand that former professional American football quarterback Tom Brady stood on when the latter made his retirement announcement up for auction. The bidding for the jar of sand started at $677 and as of February 4, 2023, has reached a price of $99,990. The bidding ended on February 12, 2023, the day of Super Bowl LVII.

See also
 Albert, Texas
 The Hands Resist Him
 Soviet submarine K-77

References

External links
 eBay website

EBay listings
Ebay